Kazi Sarwar Hossain is a retired Rear Admiral of the Bangladesh Navy and the former ambassador of Bangladesh to Maldives. He is the former Director General of the Bangladesh Coast Guard.

Early life 
Hossain did his MBA from Honolulu University. He completed defense studies from the University of Madras.

Career 
Hossain joined Bangladesh Navy in 1980. He had served in the United Nations Operation in Côte d'Ivoire.

In April 2011, Hossain as Director General of the Coast Guard received three patrol crafts transferred from Bangladesh Navy.

In January 2015, Hossain was appointed Ambassador of Bangladesh to Maldives where he replaced Rear Admiral Abu Sayed Mohammad Abdul Awal. He left the post next year after a farewell call on Vice President Abdulla Jihad of Maldives.

In March 2022, Hossain identified China and United States as key players in the Bay of Bengal. He was the second keynote speaker. He is an adviser of the Bangladesh Institute of Maritime Research and Development.

References 

Living people
Year of birth missing (living people)
High Commissioners of Bangladesh to the Maldives
Bangladesh Navy personnel
Director Generals of Bangladesh Coast Guard